Harold Abbott may refer to:

Harold Abbott (rugby union) (1882–1971), New Zealand rugby union player
Harold Abbott (artist) (1906–1986), Australian portrait painter, official war artist and art teacher
Harold Abbott (Saw), fictional character
H. H. Abbott (Harold Henry Abbott, 1891–1976), British poet

See also
Harry Abbott (disambiguation)